Bullhead Lake is a lake in Otter Tail County, in the U.S. state of Minnesota.

Bullhead Lake was named after the bullhead catfish in its waters.

See also
List of lakes in Minnesota

References

Lakes of Otter Tail County, Minnesota
Lakes of Minnesota